Illinois Route 143 is an east–west state highway in southwestern Illinois. Its western terminus is at U.S. Route 67 (very near, but not at the termini of Illinois Route 100 and Illinois Route 140) in Alton. Its eastern terminus at Illinois Route 127 at a rural intersection west of Tamalco.

Route description 
Illinois 143 overlaps Illinois Route 157 and Illinois Route 159 in Edwardsville, and Illinois Route 160 and U.S. Route 40 in Highland. It has 4 lanes from IL 140 to just east of Illinois Route 255, a portion from around Southern Illinois University Edwardsville to Edwardsville, and briefly around Interstate 55 in Edwardsville. The rest of the road is generally rural and has 2 lanes.

History 
SBI Route 143 ran from Benton to Harrisburg; this was replaced by Illinois Route 34 when it was extended north in 1937. That same year, IL 143 was applied to a former lettered route, Illinois Route 127A from Highland to Illinois 127. In 1950, it was extended west to Edwardsville. In 1964, it was extended west again to Alton, replacing Illinois Route 159. There have been no changes since.

In 1987, the alignments of Illinois Route 3, Illinois Route 100, and Illinois Route 143 were switched to their current routes in the Alton area with the opening of the extension of the Homer M. Adams Parkway and the construction of Madison Avenue in Wood River.  IL 143 was put on the new Madison Avenue alignment and routed on the Berm Highway, while IL 3 was put back on an older alignment through East Alton and the Homer Adams Parkway (later taking over the old IL 100 alignment north of Godfrey to Grafton), and IL 100 was put on then-unmarked River Road from Alton to Grafton.  The old alignment of IL 143 (Alton-Edwardsville Road) became unmarked.

Major Intersections

References

External links

143
Transportation in Madison County, Illinois
Transportation in Bond County, Illinois